Dollerup is a municipality in the district of Schleswig-Flensburg, in Schleswig-Holstein, Germany.

Notable people
 Peter Mathiesen (1696-1768),

References

Municipalities in Schleswig-Holstein
Schleswig-Flensburg